Bridge Across Forever is the second studio album of progressive rock supergroup Transatlantic, released in 2001.  For this album, the band attempted to balance each member's contributions more equally, because of criticisms that their first album, SMPT:e, was too dominated by the style of vocalist Neal Morse.  Like their first album, Bridge Across Forever was well received by critics and progressive rock fans, though it had little mainstream popularity. While it is not a concept album, all the lengthy epics share at least one movement with another.

Track listing
All songs by Neal Morse, Roine Stolt, Mike Portnoy, and Pete Trewavas, except where noted.

Limited edition bonus disc

Note
"Stranger in your Soul" ends with a fade-out, however, the ending jam is found after "Stranger in Your Soul", which actually ends at 26:06. At 27:26, there is a hidden track; a continuation of the final section of "Suite Charlotte Pike", picking up where it faded out, followed by various sound effects similar to those found at the end of "Duel with the Devil".

Personnel

Transatlantic
Neal Morse — Grand Piano, Hammond Organ, Mini Moog, Rhodes Piano, Synthesizer, Vocals, Additional Guitars and Mandolin, Drums on Bonus Disc Track 4
Roine Stolt — Electric and Acoustic Guitars, Vocals, Mellotron, Additional Keyboards and Percussion
Pete Trewavas — Warwick Bass, Taurus Bass Pedals and Vocals, Organ on Bonus Disc Track 4
Mike Portnoy — Drums and Vocals, Bass on Bonus Disc Track 4

Additional Musicians
Chris Carmichael — Violin, Viola and Cello on "Stranger in Your Soul" & "Duel With the Devil"
Keith Mears — Saxophone on "Duel With the Devil"
The "Elite" choir — Background Vocals on "Duel With The Devil"

Production
Arranged & Produced by Transatlantic
Engineered by Ed Simonton
Additional Engineering by Stewart Every (for Pete's recordings at the Racket Club, UK)
Mixed by Richard Mouser at The Mouse House, Los Angeles, CA
Mastered by Vlado Meller at Sony Music Studios NYC

Charts

References

2001 albums
Transatlantic (band) albums
Metal Blade Records albums